Epiparbattia gloriosalis is a moth in the family Crambidae. It was described by Aristide Caradja in 1925. It is found in China and India.

Subspecies
Epiparbattia gloriosalis gloriosalis (China)
Epiparbattia gloriosalis whalleyi Munroe & Mutuura, 1971 (India: Assam)

References

Moths described in 1925
Pyraustinae